Kawasaki Motors Philippines Corporation (KMPC or Kawasaki Philippines) is a subsidiary of Kawasaki Heavy Industries, Ltd. under the Motorcycle and Engine division. It manufactures motorcycle/motorcycle parts, and bicycle/bicycle parts.

Kawasaki Philippines is also the official distributor and assembler of Bajaj in the Philippines.

Background
Kawasaki Motors Philippines Corporation, located in Muntinlupa, Metro Manila, is in charge of production and distribution of Kawasaki Motors in the Philippines.

Products

Current lineup
Barako (2004–present) - 4-stroke 177cc - Business model, available with Kick starter only model / Electric + Kick starter model
Tough and Powerful (2007)
Barako II (2013-present)
Barako III FI (2022-present)
Fury (New Breed, 2015–present) - 4-stroke 125cc - With electric start underbone model
Fury RR (New Breed, 2015–present) - 4-stroke 125cc - Mag wheel version plus rear disc brake, and manual hand clutch
Curve - 4-stroke 112cc - With electric starter scooter model
KLX 150
KLX 150L
KLX 150BF
Ninja 400
Z400
Ninja ZX-25R
Versys 650 (LE 650E)
Z650 
Ninja 650
Ninja ZX-6R

They also assemble (knock-down kits) the following Bajaj models:

CT100 (2006–present) - new engine 4 stroke business model
CT100B (2017–present) - new engine 
CT125 (2018–present) - 4-stroke 125-cc business model
CT150 (2019-present) - New engine
Rouser NS200 (2015–present) - 4 stroke 200cc - Standard model
Rouser RS200 (2017–present) - 4 stroke 199.5cc - Standard model
Rouser NS160 (2018–present) - 4 stroke 160.3cc - Standard model
Rouser NS125 (2019-present)  -4 stroke 125cc
Dominar 400UG (2021-Present) -4 stroke 400cc

Discontinued products
AR-80K Liquid Cooled (1996-1998)
AR-80F Air Cooled
Aura Classic
Aura Nexus
Fury and Fury R, 1st-2nd Gen (2009-2014) - 4-stroke 125cc
B1-125 (1965-1972)
HD-1 100cc 2 stroke (197x-198x)
HD-IX 100cc 2 stroke (197x-199x)
HD-X (1982-2002) - 2-stroke 100cc
HD-II (1978-1998)
HD-III (1982-2007) - 2-stroke 125cc
Betamax (1982-1992)
San Ildefonso (1992-1993)
Kulog (1994-1995)
Kidlat/CDI 125 (1995-1997)
Zenki (1998-1999)
Olympic (2000-2001)
Brutus 140cc (2000-2005)
Palakol (2002-2003)
Tari (2004-2007)
KE 100 
KMX 125  (199x-200x)
KRR-150SSR (2003-2005)PH PRICE  P 80,87-AIR COOLED P 95,901-LIQUID COOLED
Leo Star 120SR/SSR - 2 stroke 120cc (2003-2006)
Bajaj/Kawasaki Wind 125 (2005-2009) - 4-stroke 125cc
Bajaj BYK (2005-2006) - 4-stroke 100cc
Bajaj Caliber 115
BC 125 (2008)
Bajaj Discover 135 DTS-i (2009-2019)
Bajaj Rouser 200 DTS-i (2009-2010)
Bajaj Rouser 220 DTS-i (2010-2013)
Discover 100 DTS-i (2013–present)
CT150 (Boxer) (2013–2020) - 4-stroke 150cc - Business model
Rouser 135LS (2011–2014) - 4 stroke 135cc - Standard model
Rouser 180 DTS-i (2013–2018) - 4-stroke 180cc - Standard model
CT100P - Limited version of CT100
Avenger 220 (2014–2016) - 4-stroke 220cc - Cruiser
The Wind 125 feature front disk brake and the conventional transmission (one down and four up with a clutch) as compared to the rotary transmissions found on most underbone and tricycle model motorcycles. The front head cowl conceals a set of functional clocks that provide motorcycle speed, engine revolution counter, odometer and fuel gauge. The Wind 125 retails for P54,000.

The Byk 100 is the entry-level motorcycle of Bajaj. The defining feature of the Bajaj's motorcycle is the head cowl which is also present in the Byk100. The Byk 100 uses a drum brake system for the front and a rotary type transmission with a clutch. The retail price is P34,000. However, this particular model has regressed and was replaced with the CT 100 model, which has typically the same specifications.

See also
 Kawasaki Heavy Industries Motorcycle & Engine
 Kawasaki Heavy Industries
 Kawasaki motorcycles
 List of Kawasaki motorcycles

External links
 Kawasaki Motors Philippines consumer site
 Kawasaki Commuter Bikes site
 Kawasaki Leisure Bikes site

Companies based in Muntinlupa
Kawasaki Heavy Industries
Motorcycle manufacturers of the Philippines
Philippine subsidiaries of foreign companies
Philippine companies established in 1974
Vehicle manufacturing companies established in 1974